Nicholas Van Rensselaer may refer to:

Nicholas van Rensselaer (minister) (1636–1678), Reformed Church clergyman
Nicholas van Rensselaer (military figure) (1754–1848), American Revolutionary War officer